Tomás Carbonell won in the final 7–6(14–12), 5–7, 6–2 against Christian Miniussi.

Seeds
A champion seed is indicated in bold text while text in italics indicates the round in which that seed was eliminated.

  Martín Jaite (quarterfinals)
 n/a
 n/a
  Gabriel Markus (quarterfinals)
  Jaime Oncins (first round)
  Christian Miniussi (final)
  Roberto Azar (second round)
  Tomás Carbonell (champion)

Draw

External links
 1992 Maceió Open Draw
 Results

Singles